Noonan is an extinct town in Ralls County, in the U.S. state of Missouri.

A post office called Noonan was established in 1892, and remained in operation until 1906. The community has the name of James Noonan, an early settler.

References

Ghost towns in Missouri
Former populated places in Ralls County, Missouri